Hocomo is a small unincorporated community in Howell County, Missouri, United States. It is located approximately thirteen miles southwest of West Plains on U.S. Route 160.

A post office called Hocomo was established in 1931, and remained in operation until 1981. The community's name is a contraction of "HOwell COunty, MO".

References

Unincorporated communities in Howell County, Missouri
Populated places established in 1931
Unincorporated communities in Missouri